"Roman Triptych: Meditations" is a poem by Pope John Paul II, published in the (Vatican) in March 2003 by Libreria Editrice Vaticana, with the presentation of Cardinal Joseph Ratzinger. "Roman Triptych" is the only poem John Paul II wrote during his long Pontificate. 

The official inauguration of the Italian version (translated by Grażyna Miller) of the "Roman Triptych" ("Trittico romano, Meditazioni") was a ceremony held in the "Sala Stampa Vaticana" on March 6, 2003 in the presence of the author.

External links 
 John Paul II, The Roman Triptych. Meditations, translated by Jerzy Peterkiewicz.

2003 books
Works by Pope John Paul II
2003 in Christianity